"You Open My Eyes" is a song by Australian rock group Hoodoo Gurus. It was released in January 1994 as the second single from the group's sixth studio album, Crank. The song peaked at number 43 on the ARIA Charts. This was the first Hoodoo Gurus single that was not written or co-written by Dave Faulkner. 

In June 2000, Dave Faulkner said "...[I] found Brad taking over lead vocal duties on a Hoodoo Gurus single. Though Brad had sung on every album since Mars Needs Guitars! this was the first time that people started crying out, 'It's a hit!'".

Track listing
 CD single (74321184962)
 "You Open My Eyes" — 3:20
 "Something I Forgot to Say" — 2:57 
 "Television Addict" — 3:25  (recorded live to air in Perth on 31 October 1993)

Personnel
 Richard Grossman — bass
 Dave Faulkner — lead vocals, guitar, keyboards
 Mark Kingsmill — drums
 Brad Shepherd — guitar, vocals
 Vicki Peterson (The Bangles) — backing vocals (track 1)
 Producer — Ed Stasium (track 1), Hoodoo Gurus (tracks 2, 3)
 Engineer — Paul Hamingson (track 1)

Charts

References

1994 singles
Hoodoo Gurus songs
1994 songs
Bertelsmann Music Group singles
Songs written by Brad Shepherd